The Stoning of Soraya M. is a 2009 Persian-language American drama film adapted from French-Iranian journalist Freidoune Sahebjam's 1990 book La Femme Lapidée.

The film is directed by Cyrus Nowrasteh, and stars Academy Award nominee Shohreh Aghdashloo (as Zahra), Jim Caviezel (as Freidoune Sahebjam, the foreign journalist), and Mozhan Marnò (as Soraya Manutchehri, the title character). The Stoning of Soraya M. had its world premiere at the 2008 Toronto International Film Festival, where it won the Director's Choice Award. It was also the second runner-up for the Cadillac People's Choice Award. The book has been banned in Iran.

Background 
French-Iranian journalist and war correspondent Freidoune Sahebjam was traveling through Iran, when he came upon Soraya Manutchehri's village, where he learned from her aunt about Soraya and her cruel fate. He would make Manutchehri's death the subject of his 1990 book La Femme Lapidée, which was translated into English in 1994. The Stoning of Soraya M. is an adaption of the book. Credibility of Sahebjam's story and the film plot itself is disputed by many Iranian critics, expert Elise Auerbach from Amnesty International, and film critics like Richard Nilsen from The Arizona Republic and Wesley Morris from Boston Globe.

Soraya Manutchehri (the "t" in the transcription by Sahebjam followed French spelling rules; 1951 – 15 August 1986) was a 35-year-old woman who was stoned to death in the small village of Kuhpayeh, Iran, after being accused of adultery.

Unnamed witnesses have claimed that Manutchehri's husband, Ghorban-Ali, a prison guard with a petty criminal past, was eager to get rid of her in order to marry a 14-year-old girl. Not wanting to support two families, nor return Soraya's dowry, he spread false rumours of her alleged adultery after she began cooking for a local widower. Abetted by venal and corrupt village authorities, who turned her father against her, he accused his wife of adultery. She was convicted, buried up to her waist, and stoned to death.

Her death has been described as a slow, painful event with "a carnival atmosphere led by village elders". After her death, the body was allegedly left outside so that animals could "ravage" it.

Plot 
Stranded in the remote Iranian village of Kuhpayeh by car trouble, a journalist is approached by Zahra, a woman with a harrowing tale to tell about her niece, Soraya, and the bloody circumstances of Soraya's death by stoning the previous day. The two sit down as Zahra recounts the story to Freidoune, who records the conversation. The journalist must escape with his life to tell the story to the rest of the world.

Ali is Soraya's abusive husband who tries to get the village's mullah to convince Soraya to grant him a divorce so that he can marry a 14-year-old girl. Ali is able to convince the mullah by making threats to tell the village about his past as a convict.

Ali's marriage to the teenager is conditional upon Ali's ability to save the girl's father, a doctor who has been sentenced to death for an unspecified crime. Soraya has two sons whom Ali wants. After a woman dies, Ali asks Zahra to persuade Soraya to care for the woman's now-widowed husband. Soraya starts working for the widower, and Ali uses this situation to spread lies that Soraya is being unfaithful to him so that she will be stoned and he can remarry. Ali knows if Soraya were dead, he would not have to pay child support either. Ali and the mullah start a rumor about her infidelity so they can charge her with adultery. They need one more witness to her "infidelity" to be able to formally charge her. They manipulate and threaten the widower into backing up their story. Ali then drags Soraya through the streets, beating her and publicly declaring that she has been unfaithful. Zahra intervenes, and takes her niece, Ali, and the mayor to talk privately. They bring the widower to the home, and, after he lies as instructed, a trial is pursued. Only men, including Soraya's father, are allowed while Soraya is confined in Zahra's house. She is quickly convicted. Zahra tries to flee with her and after realizing she cannot, pleads with the mayor for her life, even offering to switch places with Soraya. The conviction is upheld.

Soraya's father is given the first stone to throw, but he misses her repeatedly. A woman in the crowd pleads to the mayor that the stones missing are a sign that Soraya is innocent, but none of the men listen. Ali takes up stones and throws them himself. Her two sons are also forced to throw stones. The widower is given stones as well but instead walks away in tears. The crowd finally joins in and Soraya is stoned to death.

In the present, the widower informs the journalist that his car is fixed. The mullah and the widower are informed by Ali that his marriage to the teenage girl is off, implying that he could not spare her father from execution. Angry at Ali and the mullah, the widower admits that he lied. As the journalist attempts to leave, the mullah orders a Revolutionary Guard to stop him at gunpoint. They seize his tape recorder and destroy the tapes. Zahra then appears with the true tape in her hand. Men attempt to run after the car as the journalist drives away and escapes. Zahra triumphantly declares that now the whole world will know of the injustice that has happened.

Cast
 Mozhan Marnò as Soraya Manutchehri
 Shohreh Aghdashloo as Zahra
 Jim Caviezel as Freidoune Sahebjam
 Parviz Sayyad as Hashem
 Vida Ghahremani as Mrs. Massoud
 Navid Negahban as Ali
 Vachik Mangassarian as Morteza Ramazani, Soraya's father
 Bita Sheibani as Leila
 Noor Taher as Kataneh
 David Diaan as Ebrahim, the mayor
 Ali Pourtash as the mullah
 Laila Qutub as Mehri, the 14-year-old girl

Release

Box office and financing
The film's domestic gross was $636,246. It grossed $1,090,260 worldwide.

Film received financing led by Mpower Pictures, the company started by President John Shepherd, Stephen McEveety, and Todd Burns. Additional financing came from
Blackwater founder Erik Prince.

Critical reception
The Stoning of Soraya M. received generally mixed reviews. Review aggregator Rotten Tomatoes gives it a 59% approval rating, with an average score of 6 out of 10, based on 86 collected reviews. Its consensus states: "The Stoning of Soraya M. nearly transcends its deficiencies through the sheer strength of its subject material, but ultimately drowns out its message with an inappropriately heavy-handed approach." On Metacritic, which assigns a normalized rating out of 100 to reviews from mainstream critics, gives the film an average score of 50 based on 20 reviews, indicating "mixed or average reviews".

Accolades

See also
 Human rights in Iran
 Violence against women
 2008 in film
 Cinema of the United States
 Rajm

References

External links
 
 
 
 

2008 films
2008 drama films
American drama films
Drama films based on actual events
2000s Persian-language films
Films about capital punishment
Adultery in films
Anti-Iranian sentiments
Capital punishment in Iran
Films scored by John Debney
Films based on non-fiction books
Films set in Iran
Films set in the 1980s
Iranian-American films
Films directed by Cyrus Nowrasteh
Roadside Attractions films
Women's rights in Iran
2000s English-language films
2008 multilingual films
American multilingual films
2000s American films
Violence against women in Iran